Arlen may refer to:

 Arlen (given name), a list of people
 Arlen (surname), a list of people
 Arlen Realty and Development Corporation, an American real estate investment trust founded in 1959
 Arlen, Texas, a fictional town in the United States, where the animated television series King of the Hill is set

See also
Arland (disambiguation)
Arlan (disambiguation)
Arleen, a feminine name, also spelled Arlene
Arlyn